Daria Deeva (born 2 September 1990, Nizhny Tagil) is a Russian swimmer. She competed for Russia at the 2012 Summer Olympics, in the women's 100 m breaststroke.

References

Russian female breaststroke swimmers
Swimmers at the 2012 Summer Olympics
Olympic swimmers of Russia
Universiade medalists in swimming
1990 births
Living people
Universiade gold medalists for Russia
People from Nizhny Tagil
Medalists at the 2009 Summer Universiade
Sportspeople from Sverdlovsk Oblast